Feliciano Amaral (October 20, 1920 – July 7, 2018) was a Brazilian pastor and Christian singer.

References

1920 births
2018 deaths
20th-century Brazilian male singers
20th-century Brazilian singers
Brazilian Christian religious leaders
Brazilian gospel singers
People from Minas Gerais